Kaylia Stanton (born 17 May 1994) is an Australian netball player in the Suncorp Super Netball league, playing for the Melbourne Vixens.

Netball career 
Stanton was a member of the Australian under 21 squad and was also in the team that came in second in the 2013 World Youth Netball Championship in Glasgow, Scotland. In 2018, she again played for the West Coast Fever in the Suncorp Super Netball league. Stanton represented Australia at the 2017 Fast5 Netball World Series, where they finished runners-up to England. In 2019 she was re-signed by the Fever to the end of the 2020 season.

Personal life 
Stanton attended St Mary's Anglican Girls School in Perth, Western Australia before enrolling at Curtin University to study Nutrition and Health Promotion.

After following in her mother's footsteps and taking up athletics at a young age, Stanton was forced to choose between pursuing a career on the netball court, or on the athletics track. Stanton is the daughter of former Olympic high jumper Christine Stanton.

References

1994 births
Australian netball players
West Coast Fever players
ANZ Championship players
Living people
People educated at St Mary's Anglican Girls' School
Suncorp Super Netball players
Netball players from Western Australia
Australia international Fast5 players
Western Sting players
Australian Netball League players